Fernando González Delfín (born 9 September 1997) is a Mexican professional footballer who plays as a midfielder.

Career
González played for América at youth level for many years, appearing for their Under-20's and for América Premier during their 2018 season.

González appeared for América in Liga MX in 2019, making two appearances.

On 13 August 2019, González moved to the United States, signing for USL Championship side Colorado Springs Switchbacks.

References

1997 births
Living people
Mexican footballers
Mexican expatriate footballers
Mexican expatriate sportspeople in the United States
Expatriate soccer players in the United States
Club América footballers
Colorado Springs Switchbacks FC players
Association football forwards
Liga MX players
USL Championship players